Jiří Sequens (23 April 1922 – 21 January 2008) was a Czech film director.

Life
Sequens was born in Brno. After the Second World War, he went to Moscow where he studied film techniques. When he returned to Czechoslovakia he worked for Czechoslovak film industry. Sequens was an author of the propagandistic Czech films/TV series. His 1959 film Útek ze stínu was entered into the 1st Moscow International Film Festival where it won a Golden Medal. His 1964 film Atentát was entered into the 4th Moscow International Film Festival where it won a Golden Prize. Two years later he was a member of the jury of the 5th Moscow International Film Festival. His 1981 film Ta chvíle, ten okamžik won a Special Prize at the 12th Moscow International Film Festival.

He died in a hospital in Prague of natural causes.

Selected filmography

 Třicet případů majora Zemana
 Štědrý večer pana rady Vacátka
 Vražda v hotelu Excelsior
 Partie krásného dragouna
 Pěnička a Paraplíčko
 The Sinful People of Prague
 Atentát
 Větrná hora

References

External links
 
 Jiří Sequens, a gifted filmmaker who compromised his talents

1922 births
2008 deaths
Czech film directors
Czechoslovak film directors
Czechoslovak expatriates in the Soviet Union